Sarkand District or Sarkant District is a district of Jetisu Region in Kazakhstan. The administrative center of the district is the town of Sarkand. Population:

History
It was formed on September 3, 1928 with the center of the village of Sarkand in the Alma-Ata district on the territory of the Lepsinsky district and the Cherkasy volost. On December 17, 1930, the district was disbanded and transferred to the Aksu and Lepsinsky districts. On January 9, 1935, the Sarkand region was restored with the center in the village. Sarkand is part of the Alma-Ata region.

References

Districts of Kazakhstan
Almaty Region